The Shot is a reality television show created by Nigel Barker and produced by VH1 in 2007.  The Shot included 10 aspiring fashion photographers working through a series of games in order to win the competition. Russell James was the host/mentor.

The winner of season 1 of the show, as announced on December 23, 2007, was Maria Hartman. She beat Dean on the final challenge, and her winning shot will be used on the cover of Victoria's Secret annual catalog.  The  shot is of model Alessandra Ambrosio.  Maria  will also receive a $100,000 and a spread on Marie Claire magazine as prizes.

Contestants 

Airic
 38 years old
 Has been shooting for over 10 years
 Currently works as a photographer, make-up artist, and stylist
 Originally from Nebraska, currently lives in Los Angeles
 Has a newborn son

Balbinka 
 24 years old
 Former model
 Started taking photographs in college 5 years ago
 Originally from Poland but currently lives in Los Angeles
 Lived in Belgium where she worked for the European Parliament
 Loves to dance West African, ballroom, and modern
 Has traveled extensively all over the world and photographed her journey

Bree
 26 years old
 Originally from Perth, Western Australia, currently lives in Venice, CA
 Photographer for the Warp Tour
 Also hosts a syndicated music show

Dean Zulich
 34 years old
 Originally from Bosnia, currently lives in Seattle, WA
 Came to America to follow a girl
 Graduated from The Art Institute of Seattle in March 2007
 Was in the Bosnian army, fought in the Bosnian War
 Used to own a clothing store in Seattle

Ivan
 27 years old
 Came to the U.S. in 1998 from Croatia
 Learned to speak English 9 years ago so he could study photography in the U.S.
 Graduate of Brooks Institute of Photography in Santa Barbara, CA
 Currently pitching proposals to ad agencies and looking for the photo rep
 Eats a raw food diet
 Loves to go dancing

Jason
 39 years old
 Professional photographer
 Married to a make-up artist
 Lives in Los Angeles
 Former pro-golfer
 Comes from a film industry family

John
 24 years old
 Lives in Los Angeles
 Wedding Photographer
 Has traveled to 20 countries
 Personal goal is to travel to 4 different countries a year
 Self-taught photographer
 Drank the blood and ate the heart of a viper snake in Vietnam

Maria Hartman 
 26 years old
 Lives in Los Angeles
 Photo Retoucher/Freelance Photographer
 Used to assist David LaChapelle and Paula Abdul
 Oldest of 6 girls

Piper
 35 years old
 Originally from Nigeria, currently lives in Detroit
 Freelance Photographer and part-time cocktail server
 Avidly practices yoga
 Shot for Essence Magazine
 Dream is to shoot for Vogue magazine
 Into French avant-garde and 1970's cinema

Robin
 36 years old
 Freelance Photographer
 Has been shooting for over 20 years
 Specializes in shooting live music and rock & roll photography
 Bass player and fire breather
 Originally from New York City, currently lives in Los Angeles
 Shot Marilyn Manson's Portrait of an American Family album cover

Results 

 This photographer was on the winning team.
 This photographer had the best shot of the week.
 This photographer was on the losing team.
 This photographer was on the losing team and was in the bottom two.
 This photographer was on the losing team and was eliminated.

Challenges 
 "Passion" with Nudes
 "Stormy Romance" on a Sailing Yacht
 "Animal Frenzy" with a camel, tarantula, and monkey
 "Truth and Hair" with 3D photography
 "Vaseline Skin Care Campaign"
 "Marie Claire Campaign" with Joss Stone

External links 
 
 Maria's website
 Dean's website
 John's website
 Jason's Instagram
 Robin's Website
 Airic's website
 Piper's website
 Bree's website
 Ivan's website
Balbinka's Instagram

VH1 original programming
2000s American reality television series
2007 American television series debuts
2007 American television series endings